Aristotle Dionisio (born July  21, 1995) is a Filipino professional basketball player for the Magnolia Hotshots of the Philippine Basketball Association (PBA). He was selected 9th overall in the 2019 PBA draft by  Magnolia Hotshots.

Professional career

Magnolia Hotshots (2020–present) 
On December 8, 2019, Dionisio was selected ninth overall by the Magnolia Hotshots in the 2019 PBA draft.

PBA career statistics

As of the end of 2021 season

Season-by-season averages

|-
| align=left | 
| align=left | Magnolia
| 9 || 12.9 || .442 || .500 || .571 || 2.6 || .3 || .3 || .8 || 5.8
|-
| align=left | 
| align=left | Magnolia
| 36 || 12.0 || .382 || .325 || .680 || 2.3 || .3 || .5 || .4 || 4.1
|-class=sortbottom
| align="center" colspan=2 | Career
| 45 || 12.1 || .397 || .361 || .656 || 2.4 || .3 || .4 || .5 || 4.4

References 

1995 births
Living people
Basketball players from Bulacan
Power forwards (basketball)
Small forwards
Magnolia Hotshots players
Filipino men's basketball players
Magnolia Hotshots draft picks